Roberto Bomprezzi (born 9 October 1962) is an Italian former modern pentathlete. He competed at the 1992 Summer Olympics, winning a bronze medal in the team event. He is currently a physician in good standing at the University of Massachusetts medical center practicing neurology with a focus in multiple sclerosis. 

Bomprezzi was an athlete of Gruppo Sportivo Fiamme Azzurre.

References

External links
 

1962 births
Living people
Italian male modern pentathletes
Olympic modern pentathletes of Italy
Modern pentathletes at the 1992 Summer Olympics
Olympic bronze medalists for Italy
Olympic medalists in modern pentathlon
Sportspeople from Rome
Medalists at the 1992 Summer Olympics
Modern pentathletes of Fiamme Azzurre
20th-century Italian people